The 1983 Japan Series was the 34th edition of Nippon Professional Baseball's postseason championship series. It matched the Central League champion Yomiuri Giants against the Pacific League champion Seibu Lions. The Lions won the series in seven games and captured their second consecutive Japan Series title.

Summary

See also
1983 World Series

References

Japan Series
Saitama Seibu Lions
Yomiuri Giants
Japan Series
Japan Series
Japan Series
Japan Series
Japan Series